Watertown Unified School District is a school district in Watertown, Wisconsin, about halfway between Madison and Milwaukee.
The Superintendent of Schools is Cassandra Schug.

Schools
The district operates the following schools:
Watertown 4 Kids	
Douglas Elementary School	
Lebanon Elementary School	
Lincoln Elementary School	
Schurz	Elementary School
Webster Elementary School
Riverside Middle School
Watertown High School
Summer School

References

External links

School districts in Wisconsin
Education in Dodge County, Wisconsin